The 2017 Greensboro mayoral election was held on November 7, 2017 to elect the mayor of Greensboro, North Carolina. It saw the reelection of Nancy Vaughan.

Results

Primary 
The date of the primary was October 10.

General election

References 

Greensboro mayoral
Mayoral elections in Greensboro, North Carolina
Greensboro